Zladovska planina (Serbian Cyrillic: Зладовска планина) is a mountain in southern Serbia, near the town of Trgovište. Its highest peak Zelenčev vrh has an elevation of 1,574 meters above sea level.

References

Mountains of Serbia